Dayyam  is a 2021 Indian Telugu-language horror film written and directed by Ram Gopal Varma. The film stars Rajasekhar and Swati Dixit in pivotal roles. The film was earlier titled as Patta Pagalu.

Plot
The story revolves around Rajasekhar and his happy family. Their lives are disturbed when his teenage daughter is possessed by an evil spirit. The story explores whether or not the doting father is able to save his daughter's life.

Cast
 Rajasekhar as Shankar
 Swati Dixit as Vijji
 Ahuti Prasad
 Tanikella Bharani
 Ananth Babu
 Jeeva
 Sana
 Banerjee

Release
As the film's talkie part completed, but Jeevitha and Rajasekhar want to re-shoot some scenes but RGV was not interested and handed it over to Rajasekhar.

Reception
A reviewer from Eenadu criticized the film for its poor story and screenplay while appreciating Deekshit's performance. Surya Prakash of Asianet News also echoed the same, rating the film 1.5/5. He opined that the film was outdated, possibly because it was shot much earlier in 2014.

References

External links

Indian ghost films
Indian supernatural horror films
Films directed by Ram Gopal Varma
2021 films
2020s Telugu-language films